Butler station is a light rail station in Boston, Massachusetts. It serves the MBTA Ashmont–Mattapan High-Speed Line. It is located at Butler Street in the Lower Mills section of the Dorchester neighborhood. It serves a small residential area sandwiched between the Neponset River, Cedar Grove Cemetery, and Dorchester Park. Butler station has no MBTA bus connections. It is accessible via a wooden mini-high ramp on the station's single island platform.

History

Old Colony branches
The Old Colony built its Shawmut Branch Railroad from Harrison Square to Milton Lower Mills in December 1872, joining the Milton branch east of Butler. The area that is now the small Butler Street neighborhood was still empty land in the 1870s, but was developed by the late 1880s. The Old Colony Railroad became part of the New Haven Railroad system in 1893.vThe lines never had a station at Butler Street due to its proximity to Milton proper, though a freight house for Milton was built at the Butler Street crossing in the 1910s.

Trolley conversion and Butler station

Passenger service on the Shawmut Branch ended on September 6, 1926 to allow the Boston Elevated Railway to construct its rapid transit Dorchester Extension to Ashmont. The high-speed trolley line entered the center of the Milton branch right of way on a flyover, and ran to Milton flanked by the Milton branch tracks. Commuter rail service ended when the trolley line reached Milton, over the protests of Milton residents who wanted limited service kept while the trolley line was extended to Mattapan. After four more months of construction, the full trolley line was opened to Mattapan on December 21, 1929.

In 1930, the Boston Transit Department authorized the construction of an infill station at Butler Street, at an estimated cost of $13,695, to serve the small adjacent neighborhood. Butler Street station opened on October 7, 1931. Uniquely on the line, the station was built with a single center island platform rather than two side platforms; this was necessary because freight service continued on the Milton branch, which bracketed the trolley tracks. A footbridge spanned both freight and trolley tracks, with a set of stairs leading to the station platform, which was covered by a canopy. The freight house remained in use by the New Haven Railroad.

A parking lot north of the station was built in 1955. In the early 1980s, the station was rebuilt. The pedestrian bridge was removed and a grade crossing built for platform access; the outer parts also served as small side platforms. An awkward gable roof was added to the old canopy supports.

The MBTA closed the line on June 24, 2006 to allow a new viaduct to be constructed at Ashmont station. During the closure, all stations on the line were modernized and (except for Valley Road) made accessible. Butler station received a new platform and canopy, with a wooden ramp for accessibility. Trolley service resumed on December 22, 2007.

References

External links

MBTA – Butler
 Station from Google Maps Street View

Dorchester, Boston
Red Line (MBTA) stations
Railway stations in Boston
Railway stations in the United States opened in 1929
1929 establishments in Massachusetts